The 2019 Silverstone FIA Formula 2 round was a pair of motor races held on 13 and 14 July 2019 at the Silverstone Circuit in Silverstone, United Kingdom as part of the FIA Formula 2 Championship. It was the seventh round of the 2019 FIA Formula 2 Championship and ran in support of the 2019 British Grand Prix.

Background

Driver changes
Mahaveer Raghunathan returned to MP Motorsport after his one-race ban, replacing Patricio O'Ward. After leaving Campos Racing after the Paul Ricard round, Dorian Boccolacci returned to the series at Trident replacing Ryan Tveter.

Classification

Qualifying

Notes
 – Sean Gelael was given a three-place grid penalty for causing a collision during the practice session. He later withdrew from the race weekend following the incident.

Feature race

Notes
 – Arjun Maini originally finished 12th but received a five-second time penalty for causing a collision.
 – Nikita Mazepin received a five-second time penalty for speeding in the pit lane.
 – Giuliano Alesi received a five-second time penalty for speeding in the pit lane and a thirty-second time penalty for an unsafe release.

Sprint race

Championship standings after the round

Drivers' Championship standings

Teams' Championship standings

References

External links 
 

Silverstone
Silverstone Formula 2
Formula 2